"Carry Me Home" is a song by gospel house/progressive house group Gloworm, fronted by American singer Sedric Johnson. It features vocals by Pauline Taylor and was released as a single in May 1994. It reached number five in Iceland, number eight in Ireland, and number nine in both Norway and the United Kingdom. In the latter, it also peaked at number two on the UK Dance Singles Chart, while on the Eurochart Hot 100, the song reached number 36 in June 1994.

Critical reception
British Liverpool Echo described the song as a "mixture of house and gospel", that "matches rhythmic piano with big, passionate vocals." Maria Jimenez from Music & Media viewed it as "soul powered". She added, "On Rollo's Rushin' Mix, the message is delivered via a fierce house basis of rhythms and grooves and overwhelmingly passionate vocals courtesy of Sedric Johnson." Andy Beevers from Music Week wrote, "This belated follow up to "Lift My Cup" uses the same formula of Sedric Johnson's strong gospel-influenced soul vocals backed by Rollo's charging house rhythms. Unfortunately the production does not sound as fresh this time around." The magazine's RM Dance Update declared it as an "excellent return to form". James Hamilton described it as a "Sedric Johnson groaned Norman Whitfield-goes-Euro type hybrid".

Music video
A music video was produced to promote the single, directed by British director Lindy Heymann. It was filmed in the US and released on April 25, 1994. In the video, the band party in Long Beach, California.

Track listings
 12-inch single, UK
 "Carry Me Home" (Rollo's Rushin' mix) – 6:43
 "Carry Me Home" (Will's Procastinatin' mix) – 6:23
 "Carry Me Home" (Rollo's Rushin' dub) – 4:57
 "Home" – 6:46

 CD single, UK and Europe
 "Carry Me Home" (radio mix) – 3:45
 "Carry Me Home" (Will's Procrastinatin' mix) – 6:23
 "Carry Me Home" (Rollo's Rushin' mix) – 6:43
 "Home" – 7:52

 Cassette single, UK and Europe
 "Carry Me Home" (radio mix)
 "Carry Me Home" (Rollo's Rushin' dub)

Charts

Weekly charts

Year-end charts

References

1994 singles
1994 songs
House music songs
Go! Discs singles
Music videos directed by Lindy Heymann